KXVU-LD, virtual channel 17 (VHF digital channel 3), is a low-powered Antenna TV-affiliated television station licensed to Chico, California, United States. Owned by the Sinclair Broadcast Group, it is a sister station to ABC affiliate KRCR-TV (channel 7) and four other low-power stations: MyNetworkTV affiliates Redding-licensed KRVU-LD (channel 21) and Chico-licensed KZVU-LD (channel 22); Chico-licensed Univision affiliate KUCO-LD (channel 27); and Chico-licensed UniMás affiliate KKTF-LD (channel 30). Sinclair also operates Paradise-licensed Fox affiliate KCVU (channel 20) under a local marketing agreement (LMA) with owner Cunningham Broadcasting. However, Sinclair effectively owns KCVU as the majority of Cunningham's stock is owned by the family of deceased group founder Julian Smith. The stations share studios on Auditorium Drive east of downtown Redding and maintain a news bureau and sales office at the former Sainte Television Group facilities on Main Street in downtown Chico (for FCC and other legal purposes, the Chico/Paradise-licensed stations still use the Chico address and Redding-licensed stations use the Redding address). KXVU-LD's transmitter is located along Cohasset Road northeast of Chico.

History
The station started broadcasting in 2006.  It was founded by Chester Smith of Sainte Partners II, L.P., joining sister station and Univision affiliate KUCO-LD as the only two Spanish-language stations in the North Valley until they also founded UniMás affiliate KKTF-LD (channel 30).  After the sale of Sainte's assets to Bonten Media Group (owners of ABC affiliates KRCR-TV in Redding and KAEF-TV (channel 23) in Eureka) in 2014, the new owners sold the rights of Telemundo to K4 Media Holdings and moved the station from KXVU-LP to KNVN-DT2, which is now operated by Allen Media Broadcasting.

On April 21, 2017, Sinclair announced its intent to purchase the Bonten stations for $240 million. The sale was completed September 1.

Subchannel

References

External links
 Antenna TV website

XVU-LP
Antenna TV affiliates
Television channels and stations established in 2006
Sinclair Broadcast Group
Low-power television stations in the United States